Ramchandra Punaji Avsare is a member of the 13th Maharashtra Legislative Assembly. He represented the Bhandara Assembly Constituency. He belongs to the Bharatiya Janata Party (BJP) Avsare's victory was part of a clean sweep made by BJP in Bhandara district. In 2009 he was with the Shiv Sena. In June, 2015, it was reported that his election was challenged in court by one Ranjit Chavan. A special bench under Justice Prasanna Varale has been established to deal with the case.

References

Maharashtra MLAs 2014–2019
People from Bhandara district
Shiv Sena politicians
Bharatiya Janata Party politicians from Maharashtra
Maharashtra politicians
Living people
Year of birth missing (living people)